Daniel Ademinokan is a Nigerian-born film and TV director, screenwriter, and film producer. He has worked as a screenwriter and postproduction guru in Nollywood since the late 1990s but he rose to prominence as a director with the critically acclaimed feature film Black Friday in 2010. He is the CEO and co-founder of Index Two Studios LLC which he co-owned with his ex-wife Stella Damasus. After their divorce in 2020, Daniel launched Leon Global Media, LLC with the release of the feature film GONE. Daniel currently lives in Houston, Texas.

Education 
Daniel earned a Bachelor's degree in Computer Science in Nigeria. After that, he moved to the United States where he studied filmmaking at the Digital Film Academy in New York. He went on to study Digital Cinematography at the New York Film Academy.

Career 
Daniel started as a scriptwriter in Nollywood and he wrote several screenplays that became big hits in the 1990s. He became famous with his movie Black Friday, a movie that was nominated for five different awards at the Africa Movie Academy Awards. His critically acclaimed short film No Jersey, No Match in 2010 starred Gabriel Afolayan. No Jersey, No Match won the award for Best Short Film at the Abuja International Film Festival and later screened at the Hoboken Film Festival in New Jersey.

Personal life 
Daniel married Doris Simeon in 2008 and they were divorced in 2011. Together, Daniel and Doris have a son named David Ademinokan, who was born in 2008. Daniel married Stella Damasus in 2012. and they were divorced in 2020.

Filmography 

 Gone (2021)
 Shuga (TV series)
 Here (Short 2019/II)
 Between (2018/III)
 The Other Wife' (2018)
 The Search (2012/V)
 Ghetto Dreamz: The Dagrin Story (documentary 2011)
 Unwanted Guest (2011)
 Eti Keta (2011)
 Bursting Out (2010)
 Too Much (2010/I)
 Modúpé Tèmi (Video 2008)
 In the Eyes of My Husband (video 2007)
 In the Eyes of My Husband 2 (video 2007)
 In the Eyes of My Husband 3 (video 2007)
 Onitemi (video 2007)
 The Love Doctor (video 2007)
 Omo jayejaye (video 2006)
 Black Friday'' (2010)

References

External links 
 

Nigerian male film actors
Nigerian film directors
Nigerian film producers
Nigerian screenwriters
21st-century Nigerian actors
20th-century Nigerian actresses
Nigerian businesspeople
Nigerian chief executives
Nigerian male television actors
Year of birth missing (living people)
Living people